Gheyb Ali (also Romanized as Gheyb ‘Alī and Gheyb‘alī) is a village in Mahmudabad Rural District, in the Central District of Shahin Dezh County, West Azerbaijan Province, Iran. At the 2006 census, its population was 93, in 19 families.

References 

Populated places in Shahin Dezh County